Anti Hero is a song by British recording artist Marlon Roudette from his debut studio album Matter Fixed. It was released as the second single from the album on 20 January 2012. The song has charted in Austria, Germany and Switzerland. The song was written by Roudette and Naughty Boy.

Music video
A music video to accompany the release of "Anti Hero (Brave New World)" was first released onto Marlon Roudette's official site on 20 January 2012 at a total length of three minutes and twenty-six seconds.

Track listing
 Amazon Single - Digital download
"Anti Hero" (Single Version) – 3:28
"Brotherhood of the Broken" – 4:04

Credits and personnel
Lead vocals – Marlon Roudette
Producer – Naughtyboy
Lyrics – Marlon Roudette, Naughtyboy
Label: Universal Music

Charts and certifications

Weekly charts

Anti Hero (Brave New World)

Anti Hero (Le saut de l'ange)

Year-end charts

Certifications

Release history

References

External links
 Anti Hero, official music video.

2012 songs
Marlon Roudette songs
2012 singles
Song recordings produced by Naughty Boy
Songs written by Marlon Roudette
Songs written by Naughty Boy